Not in Love may refer to:
"Not in Love" (Enrique Iglesias song), 2004
"Not in Love" (M.O song), 2016
"Not in Love" (Platinum Blonde song), 1984

See also
"I'm Not in Love", a 1975 song by English group 10cc